Burliar or Varaliyaru (வறளியாறு) is a Panchayat village in Coonoor Taluk of The Nilgiris District, Tamil Nadu, India.

Location 
It is situated on National Highway NH 67 between Mettupalayam(Coimbatore) and Coonoor on the Coonoor Ghat Road at an altitude of 800 to 830 metres above mean sea level. It is on the border between the Coimbatore District and The Nilgiris District.

Features 
Burliar is best known as a rest stop on this Ghat Road. Most people are employed in the running of small shops and restaurants that cater to the needs of travelers. When the road has been closed (for example due to landslides), many of the villagers have left to seek other employment elsewhere.

State Horticulture farm 
This  horticulture farm  was  started by  K.B.Thomas in  the  year  1871,  the  then  Collector  of Coimbatore  and  Nilgiris. The total area of the farm is about  6.25  hectares. The  main  area is  made  up  of  68  terraces  and  planted  with  spices  crops  like  clove,  nutmeg,  cinnamon,  pepper,  and  vanilla  and  fruits like  mangosteen,  jack,  durain,  litchi,  longsal,  carambola,  grape  fruits,  rose apple  and  mango.

References 

Villages in Nilgiris district